The katal (symbol: kat) is the unit of catalytic activity in the International System of Units (SI) used for quantifying the catalytic activity of enzymes (that is, measuring  the enzymatic activity level in enzyme catalysis) and other catalysts.

The katal is invariant of the measurement procedure, but the measured numerical value is not; the value depends on the experimental conditions. Therefore, to define the quantity of a catalyst in katals, the rate of conversion of a defined chemical reaction is specified as moles reacted per second. One katal of trypsin, for example, is that amount of trypsin which breaks one mole of peptide bonds in one second under specified conditions.

Definition
One katal refers to an enzyme catalysing the reaction of one mole of substrate per second. Because this is such a large unit for most enzymatic reactions, the nanokatal (nkat) is used in practice.

The katal is not used to express the rate of a reaction; that is expressed in units of concentration per second, as moles per liter per second. Rather, the katal is used to express catalytic activity, which is a property of the catalyst.

SI multiples

History 
The General Conference on Weights and Measures and other international organizations recommend use of the katal. It replaces the non-SI enzyme unit of catalytic activity. The enzyme unit is still more commonly used than the katal, especially in biochemistry. The adoption of the katal has been slow.

Origin

The name "katal" has been used for decades. The first proposal to make it an SI unit came in 1978, and it became an official SI unit in 1999. The name comes from the Ancient Greek κατάλυσις (katalysis), meaning "dissolution"; the word "catalysis" itself is a Latinized form of the Greek word.

References

External links
 Unit "katal" for catalytic activity (IUPAC Technical Report) Pure Appl. Chem. Vol. 73, No. 6, pp. 927–931 (2001) 
 

SI derived units
Units of catalytic activity
Units of chemical measurement